John Evan (born John Spencer Evans; born 28 March 1948, in Derby, Derbyshire.) is a British musician and composer. He is best known for having played keyboards for Jethro Tull from April 1970 to June 1980. Evans' father was headmaster at a Derbyshire village school and his mother was a local concert pianist and piano teacher.  The family moved to Blackpool, Lancashire in October 1949. Evans was educated at Blackpool Grammar School, where he met Ian Anderson and Jeffrey Hammond, and Chelsea College, now King's College London.

Early career
Evans changed his name when his first band, The Blades, changed their name to The John Evan Band. Jeffrey Hammond apparently thought 'The John Evan Band' sounded better than 'The John Evans Band'. He participated in the Blackpool musical scene, with most of the musicians that would become Jethro Tull, including Barrie Barlow, Jeffrey Hammond, Glenn Cornick and Ian Anderson.

Later on, Evan was attending college when he happened to recognize his then future bandmates on the radio with the song "Living in the Past", remarking years later that it stood out to him because of its quite unusual time signature for a pop song.

Jethro Tull
In 1970, he played as a session musician on Jethro Tull's Benefit album (where his acknowledgement reads: "...and John Evan, who played keyboards for our 'benefit'"), and was eventually convinced by Ian Anderson to leave school to become a full-fledged member of the band. In addition to his many distinctive contributions to the group's overall musical sound and stage personality, it is also notable that Evan composed the memorable piano introduction to "Locomotive Breath", having achieved this task in studio while some of the other band members were out to lunch.

Whilst with Jethro Tull, Evan had a penchant for wearing his trademark white suit, along with a yellow shirt underneath and a pink-and-yellow polka-dot tie. Evan can be seen wearing this outfit in photographs on the album War Child, and the live album Bursting Out, while a painted version of him is seen wearing the suit and tie on the inside cover of the Aqualung album. During concerts, Evan's wildly rendered pantomime gestures would conjure visions for audiences of a cross between Harpo Marx and The Hatter from  Alice's Adventures in Wonderland (sans the hat). Because of the familiar white suit, Anderson was known to jokingly refer to Evan (during band member introductions) as "everyone's favourite ice cream salesman".

After Jethro Tull
Evan departed Jethro Tull in July 1980, with the "Big Split" of the band. He then went on to form Tallis with fellow departing Tull member, Dee Palmer. He appeared in the 2004 DVD Jethro Tull – A New Day Yesterday: The 25th Anniversary Collection (1969–1994) (originally released in 1994 on VHS), the 2008 DVD Jethro Tull – Their Fully Authorised Story (1968–2008), and the 2009 CD/DVD combo Jethro Tull – Live at Madison Square Garden (1978). In 2018, Evan appeared in a video segment, dressed as a flower, during Ian Anderson's Jethro Tull 50th Anniversary tour.

Album discography

With The John Evan Band
Live 1966 (A New Day Records)

With Jethro Tull
Studio albums
 Benefit (1970 - as session musician)
 Aqualung (1971)
 Thick as a Brick (1972)
 A Passion Play (1973)
 War Child (1974)
 Minstrel in the Gallery (1975)
 Too Old to Rock 'n' Roll: Too Young to Die! (1976)
 Songs from the Wood (1977)
 Heavy Horses (1978)
 Stormwatch (1979)

Compilations
 Living in the Past (1972)
 20 Years of Jethro Tull
 25th Anniversary Box Set
 Nightcap

Live albums
 Bursting Out (1978)
 Nothing Is Easy: Live at the Isle of Wight 1970 (as session musician, released in 2004)
 Live at Carnegie Hall 1970 (as session musician, released in 2015)
 Live at Madison Square Garden 1978

References

External links
Biography on official Jethro Tull website

1948 births
Living people
English keyboardists
English rock keyboardists
Jethro Tull (band) members
People from Blackpool
Alumni of King's College London
Progressive rock keyboardists
Progressive rock organists</ref>
Progressive rock pianists
21st-century organists